Hasnaa Lachgar (born 27 September 1989) is a Moroccan boxer. She competed in the women's lightweight event at the 2016 Summer Olympics.

References

External links
 
 
 

1989 births
Living people
Moroccan women boxers
Olympic boxers of Morocco
Boxers at the 2016 Summer Olympics
Place of birth missing (living people)
Lightweight boxers